Panicos is a given name. Notable people with the given name include: 

Panicos Chrysanthou (born 1951), Cypriot filmmaker and documentarian
Panicos O. Demetriades (born 1959), Cypriot economist
Panicos Nicolaou, Cypriot banker
Panicos Orphanides (born 1961), Cypriot footballer and manager
Panicos Pounas (born 1969), Cypriot footballer